Woodcote is a village in Oxfordshire, England.

Woodcote may also refer to:
Woodcote, London, England
Woodcote, Shropshire, a location in England
Woodcote, Surrey, a location in England
 - an East Indiaman launched in 1786 that the French captured in 1798
Woodcote, a corner of the Silverstone Circuit